The Brownrigg Baronetcy is a title in the Baronetage of the United Kingdom. It was created on 9 March 1816 for General Robert Brownrigg. He was Governor of Ceylon from 1813 to 1820. He was succeeded by his grandson, the second Baronet. On his death the title passed to his younger brother, the third Baronet. His eldest surviving son, the fourth Baronet, was a Rear-Admiral in the Royal Navy. As of 2018 the title is held by the latter's great-grandson, the sixth Baronet, who succeeded his father in 2018. He is the grandson of Gawen Egremont Brownrigg (1911–1938), son of the fourth Baronet.

Brownrigg baronets (1816)
Sir Robert Brownrigg, 1st Baronet (1758–1833)
Colonel R. J. Brownrigg
Sir Robert William Colebrooke Brownrigg, 2nd Baronet (1817–1882)
Sir Henry Moore Brownrigg, 3rd Baronet (1819–1900)
Rear Admiral Sir Douglas Egremont Robert Brownrigg, CB, 4th Baronet (1867–1939)
Gawen Egremont Brownrigg (1911–1938)
Sir Nicholas Gawen Brownrigg, 5th Baronet (1932–2018)
Sir Michael Gawen Brownrigg, 6th Baronet (b. 1961)

The heir apparent is the current holder's eldest son, Nicholas James Brownrigg (born 1993).

Notes

References

Brownrigg